The 1868 United States presidential election in Massachusetts took place on November 3, 1868, as part of the 1868 United States presidential election. Voters chose 12 representatives, or electors to the Electoral College, who voted for president and vice president.

Massachusetts voted for the Republican nominee, Ulysses S. Grant, over the Democratic nominee, Horatio Seymour. Grant won the state by a margin of 39.53%.

With 69.76% of the popular vote, Massachusetts would be Grant's second strongest victory in terms of popular vote percentage after neighboring Vermont.

As of 2021, this is the last time that Suffolk County, which contains the city of Boston, was not the most Democratic county in Massachusetts.

Results

See also
 United States presidential elections in Massachusetts

References

Massachusetts
1868
1868 Massachusetts elections